Sedillot is a surname. Notable people with the surname include:

 Charles-Emmanuel Sédillot (1804–1883), French military physician and surgeon
 René Sédillot (1906–1999), French journalist and historian
 Louis-Pierre-Eugène Sédillot (1808–1875), French orientalist and historian